Dawid Schalk Pienaar "Dawie" Ackermann (3 June 1930 – 1 January 1970), was a South African international rugby union and rugby league footballer. His position was at Flanker (or loose forward in rugby league).

Rugby union career
Ackermann started his career as a rugby union player, appearing for Western Province and Transvaal. He also played in eight test matches for South Africa between 1955 and 1958.

Rugby league career
In 1962, Ackermann was one of a number of high profile South African players to switch to rugby league. He was selected by the RLSA to play in a three match series against Great Britain, who were returning from their 1962 tour of Australia and New Zealand. Ackermann played in all three games, scoring a try in the second game.

In 1963, he was part of the team which toured Australia and New Zealand, captaining the side in the two games against Australia. Following the collapse of rugby league in South Africa after the tour, Ackermann was forced to retire due to the ban on rugby league players from participating in rugby union.

References

External links
 Dawie Ackermann at Rugby League Project

1930 births
1970 deaths
Rugby league locks
Rugby league players from Eastern Cape
Rugby union flankers
Rugby union players from the Eastern Cape
South Africa international rugby union players
South Africa national rugby league team captains
South Africa national rugby league team players
South African rugby league players
Western Province (rugby union) players